Samacá is a town and municipality in the Central Boyacá Province, part of the Colombian Department of Boyacá. It borders Cucaita, Tunja and Ventaquemada in the east, Ráquira in the west, Sáchica, Sora and Cucaita in the north and Ventaquemada, Ráquira and Guachetá, Cundinamarca in the south.

Etymology 
Samacá's original name came from the Chibcha native language of the area. Samacá was a small village before the Spanish conquest of the Muisca. Sa is a noble title; Ma is a proper name; Cá means a sovereign enclosure.

History 
Samacá began as a settlement of a large lagoon which was known by the native name of "Lake of Cansicá" or "Valley of the Lake" (la laguna de Cansicá). Around the lagoon were three native settlements called Patagüy, Foacá and Sáchica. Samacá was ruled by the zaque of nearby Hunza and the modern town was founded on January 1, 1556 by Juan de los Barrios.

Economy 
The most important activities are farming, cattle, and mining. Samacá produces potatoes, peas, corn, and beet. Coal mining is the largest industry and most of the production of coal is exported. Samacá has a potential for growth; in the last decade the economy has risen tremendously. Samacá is open to international investment.

Born in Samacá 
 Pedro Saúl Morales, former professional cyclist
 Jorge Perry, Colombia's first olympic competitor

References 

Municipalities of Boyacá Department
Populated places established in 1556
1556 establishments in the Spanish Empire